Temenos AG (SWX: TEMN) is a company specialising in enterprise software for banks and financial services, with its headquarters in Geneva, Switzerland. Temenos was initially created in 1993, and has been listed on the Swiss stock exchange since 2001.

Company profile
Founded in 1993 and listed on the Swiss stock exchange (SIX: TEMN), Temenos AG is a provider of banking software systems to retail, corporate, universal, private, treasury, fund administration, Islamic, microfinance and community banks. Headquartered in Geneva, Switzerland, and with 67 offices in 40 countries, Temenos serves over 3,000 financial institutions in 145 countries across the world. It claims to be used by 41 of the top 50 banks worldwide.

History
The company was started in November 1993, by George Koukis and Kim Goodall, having acquired the rights to GLOBUS, the successful banking software platform developed by a team of technical and banking experts in 1988. The company was renamed to Temenos, in reference to a lecture on money given by Hans-Wolfgang Frick at the Temenos Academy (1992), and continued to develop and market GLOBUS.

In 2001, Temenos went public, and is listed on the main segment of the SWX Swiss Exchange (TEMN). Also in 2001, Temenos acquired a mainframe core banking application aimed at high-end retail banks, originally developed by IBM, and now marketed as Temenos Corebanking.

On 30 September 2003, Temenos launched its T24 banking package. T24 was based on GLOBUS, but with a state-of-the-art banking technology platform.  This was the result of 3 years of development effort and an investment of more than US$24 million.

In 2011, George Koukis stepped down as chairman and became a non-executive director, and Andreas Andreades became chairman.

In 2021, Temenos has launched a new collaborative fintech marketplace, Temenos Exchange. The marketplace offers pre-integrated and approved fintech solutions.

Acquisitions

References

Software companies of Switzerland
Banking software companies
Financial software companies
Companies based in Geneva
Companies listed on the SIX Swiss Exchange
Swiss brands
Software companies established in 1993
Swiss companies established in 1993